Herbert Dorrington (21 June 1889 – 2 January 1941) was a South African cricketer. He played in four first-class matches for Eastern Province from 1908/09 to 1912/13.

See also
 List of Eastern Province representative cricketers

References

External links
 

1889 births
1941 deaths
South African cricketers
Eastern Province cricketers
Cricketers from Port Elizabeth